The Tingler is a 1959 American horror film produced and directed by William Castle. It is the third of five collaborations between Castle and writer Robb White, and starring Vincent Price.

The film tells the story of a scientist who discovers a parasite in human beings, called a "tingler", which feeds on fear. The creature earned its name by making the spine of its host "tingle" when the host is frightened. In line with other Castle horror films, including Macabre (1958) and House on Haunted Hill (1959), Castle used gimmicks to sell the film. The Tingler remains most well known for a gimmick called "Percepto!", a vibrating device, in some of the theater chairs, which the onscreen action activated.

Released in the United States on July 19, 1959, The Tingler received mixed reviews, but has since gone through some critical reevaluation and is now considered a camp cult film.

Plot
A pathologist, Dr. Warren Chapin, discovers that the tingling of the spine in states of extreme fear is due to the growth of a creature that every human being seems to have, called a "tingler," a parasite attached to the human spine. It curls up, feeds, and grows stronger when its host is afraid, effectively crushing the person's spine if curled up long enough. The host can weaken the creature and stop its curling by screaming.

Movie theater owner Oliver Higgins, who shows exclusively silent films, is an acquaintance of Dr. Chapin. Higgins' wife, Martha, is deaf and mute and therefore cannot scream. She dies of fright after weird, apparently supernatural events appear in her room. During her autopsy, Chapin removes a tingler from her spine.

After they contain the tingler and return to Higgins' house, it is revealed that Higgins is the murderer; he frightened his wife to death, knowing that she could not scream because she was mute. The centipede-like creature eventually breaks free from the container that held it and is released into Higgins' theater. The tingler latches onto a woman's leg, and she screams until it releases its grip. Chapin controls the situation by shutting off the lights and telling everyone in the theater to scream. When the tingler has left the showing room, they resume the movie and go to the projection room, where they find the tingler and capture it.

Guessing that the only way to neutralize the tingler is to reinsert it inside Martha's body, Chapin does so. After he leaves, Higgins, who has admitted his guilt to Chapin, is alone in the room. As if by supernatural forces, the door slams shut and locks itself, and the window closes, echoing what happened just before Martha was frightened to death. The tingler causes the body of Martha to rise from the bed, staring at her husband. Higgins is so terrified that he is unable to scream. The screen fades, and Dr. Chapin's voice says, "Ladies and gentlemen, just a word of warning. If any of you are not convinced that you have a tingler of your own, the next time you are frightened in the dark... don't scream."

Film prologue
In a similar manner as Universal's Frankenstein (1931), Castle opened the film with an on-screen warning to the audience:

Cast
 Vincent Price as Dr. Warren Chapin
 Judith Evelyn as Mrs. Martha Ryerson Higgins
 Darryl Hickman as Dave Morris
 Patricia Cutts as Isabel Stevens Chapin
 Pamela Lincoln as Lucy Stevens
 Philip Coolidge as Oliver 'Ollie' Higgins

Production
After the financial success of House on Haunted Hill, Castle moved his independent production unit from Allied Artists to Columbia to produce The Tingler. Price was on board again, with Hickman playing his assistant and newcomer Lincoln playing his sister-in-law. Cutts played Price's unfaithful wife Isabel. The Tingler was Price's second and final film with Castle and the fifth performance that would ultimately brand him as "The Master of Menace".

Castle convinced Hickman, who was Lincoln's real-life fiancé, to join the cast as her fiancé in the film. At first Hickman declined, but agreed after Castle convinced him it would help Lincoln's career. According to Hickman, Castle did such a good job of convincing him it would help Lincoln that he worked for no salary. Hickman, who was 5'10", was required to wear lifts for the scenes with 6'4" Vincent Price to offset the disparity of their heights.

Evelyn was hired at the request of Price, who had worked with her on Broadway. She also received attention in another prominent "non-speaking role" as the suicidal "Miss Lonelyhearts" in Hitchcock's Rear Window (1954). Dal McKennon, the projectionist (uncredited in the film), had a successful career as the voice of many screen and TV characters, including "Buzz Buzzard" in the Woody Woodpecker cartoons and "Gumby" in the TV clay animation series. Jack Dusick, make-up artist for The Tingler, was the father of singer/actress Michele Lee.

White, the story author, was partly inspired by his encounter with a centipede while living in the British Virgin Islands.

White had experimented with LSD at UCLA after hearing about it from Aldous Huxley and decided to work it into the script. It is the first depiction of LSD use in a major motion picture. At the time, the drug was legal. The title of the book that Vincent Price's character reads before taking LSD—Fright Effects Induced by Injection of Lysergic Acid LSD25—is printed on the back of the book, not the front. This was done for a better shot of the expositional title of the book, explaining the effects of LSD to the audience.

Location shots were filmed at the Columbia Ranch in Burbank, California.

The movie playing in the theater when the tingler escapes was the 1921 silent film Tol'able David.

Analysis
A subplot of the film involves the fates of a movie theater specializing in silent films and its owners. According to Kevin Heffernan, this reflects the conditions of the movie theater industry in the late 1950s. There were many discount theaters trying to establish their own market niche by showing older films. For the owners of these small theaters, it was a thankless and poorly paid job, as described in the trade journals of this period. When Ollie describes at length the work load involved in cleaning the building, he echoes real-life complaints. This provides the motive for his murder, as he is trying to escape a hopeless life.

Another subplot involves dysfunctional married lives. Most prominent is that of Warren to Isabelle, who is clearly unfaithful to him. She stays out until the early hours of the morning and is seen giving her lover a farewell kiss. In another scene, Warren enters through the front door of his house and hears the back door slam. He then discovers two used glasses of wine and a forgotten tie clip. In an argument between them, she does not deny her unfaithfulness, but counters by accusing her husband of neglecting her. While spending so many hours in his laboratory, he has lost contact with living people, leaving her no choice but to seek human affection elsewhere. The marriage of Ollie and Martha is also an unhappy one. He claims that Martha would have killed him if she could.

Martha is depicted as a woman with a whole range of obsessive and phobic traits. Tim Lucas has described her as a silent film character in a sound film. The idea of a terrified, mute woman was not fully original. According to Heffernan, it was probably inspired by The Spiral Staircase (1946).

The scene with the LSD trip offers a display of "stylized and exaggerated performance". The eyes of Warren shift from side to side, gazing suspiciously at his environment, while describing feelings of unease and apprehension. He loosens his tie, when he thinks himself unable to breathe. He opens a window while insisting that it is nailed shut. He sees a hanging skeleton as a moving figure, and describes the walls of the room as closing in on him. Finally he visibly struggles with the urge to scream, and succumbs to it.

Gimmicks
William Castle was known for his movie gimmicks, and The Tingler featured one of his best: "Percepto!". Previously, he had offered a $1,000 life insurance policy against "Death by Fright" for Macabre (1958) and sent a skeleton flying above the audiences' heads in the auditorium in House on Haunted Hill (1959). The gimmicks for The Tingler increased the film's cost from $400,000 to $1 million.

Percepto: "Scream for your lives!"
"Percepto!" was a gimmick where Castle attached electrical "buzzers" to the underside of some seats in theaters where The Tingler was screened to provide "tingling" sensations during certain scenes. The buzzers were small surplus airplane wing deicing motors left from World War II. The cost of this equipment added $250,000 to the film's budget. It was used predominantly in larger theaters. The prologue claimed some people might not be susceptible to the "tingling" to take account that not all seats were wired.

During the climax of the film, The Tingler was unleashed in the movie theater, while the audience watched a climactic fight scene in Tol'able David (1921). The film stops and, in some real-life theaters, the house lights came on, a woman screamed and pretended to faint and was then taken away in a stretcher; all part of the show arranged by Castle. From the screen, the voice of Price mentioned the fainted lady and asked the rest of the audience to remain seated. The film-within-a-film resumed and was interrupted again. The projected film appeared to break as the silhouette of the tingler moved across the projection beam. The image of the film went dark, all lights in the auditorium (except fire exit signs) went off, and Price's voice warned the audience, "Ladies and gentlemen, please do not panic. But scream! Scream for your lives! The tingler is loose in this theater!" This cued the theater projectionist to activate the Percepto! buzzers, giving some audience members an unexpected jolt, followed by a highly visible physical reaction. The voices of scared patrons were heard from the screen, replaced by the voice of Price, who explained that the tingler was paralyzed and the danger was over. At this point, the film resumed its normal format, which was used for its epilogue.

An alternate warning was recorded for drive-in theaters; this warning advised the audience the tingler was loose in the drive-in. Castle's voice was substituted for Price's in this version.

Castle's autobiography, Step Right Up!: I'm Gonna Scare the Pants off America, erroneously stated that "Percepto!" delivered electric shocks to the theater seats.

In the 1980 book The Golden Turkey Awards by Harry and Michael Medved, Percepto won the award for "The Most Inane and Unwelcome 'Technical Advance" in Hollywood History".

Two Joe Dante films contain scenes which reference the "Percepto!" gimmick: Gremlins 2: The New Batch (1990) and Matinee (1993).

Fainting customers and medical assistance
To enhance the climax even more, Castle hired fake "screamers and fainters" planted in the audience. There were fake nurses stationed in the foyer and an ambulance outside of the theater. The "fainters" would be carried out on a gurney and whisked away in the ambulance, to return for the next showing.

"Bloody Bathtub" scene 

Although The Tingler was filmed in black-and-white, a short color sequence was spliced into the film. It showed a sink (in black-and-white) with bright-red "blood" flowing from the taps and a black-and-white Evelyn watching a bloody red hand rising from a bathtub, likewise filled with the bright red "blood". Castle used color film for the effect. The scene was accomplished by painting the set white, black and gray and applying gray makeup to the actress to simulate monochrome.

Release
Test engagements started in Detroit on August 5, 1959 with further engagements in Boston, Baltimore and San Francisco.

Reception
Contemporary reviews of The Tingler were mixed. Shortly after the film's release, Howard Thompson of The New York Times said, "William Castle has been serving some of the worst, dullest little horror entries ever to snake into movie houses".
In his August 1959 appraisal of the picture, "Ron." of Variety disagreed with Thompson, calling it "highly entertaining" and characterizing "Percepto" as "effective, not so much because of the 'tingle' but because it 'menacingly' moves closer and closer in waves and, coupled with a whirring noise and sound-track heartbeats and screams, puts the filmgoer in the midst of the horror."

In the decades after its initial release, the film has been praised by some other reviewers for its sheer camp qualities. In 1999, Harvey O'Brien of Harvey's Movie Review commended the production despite "all its flaws", adding that "The Tingler is very watchable and has been put together with enough canniness to be enjoyable on its own terms". Also, while Time Out London in its 2005 review regarded the screenplay as "ingeniously ludicrous", Lyz Kingsley of And You Call Yourself a Scientist! pointed out in 2006 that "no film made before or after it quite matches it for its mix of the imaginative, the creepy, the funny, and the downright weird". Classic-Horror.com that same year complimented the horror tale as well, remarking that "the acting is fine, the direction is among Castle's best, and the script is semi-brilliant for the time". 

Later, writing on behalf of Slant Magazine in 2009, Chuck Bowen said, "Ludicrousness aside, Tingler is still one of the more confident Castle pictures: a well paced, at times intentionally, funny parody of 1950s domestication, with every couple in the story trying to off one another for a variety of amusingly convoluted reasons. Think Burn After Reading with dime store production values and a plastic spinal cord at its center."

Cult film writer David Harkin also found several positive aspects about the production in his 2021 assessment, noting that "The master behind this mayhem is director William Castle, a kind of ‘Poverty Row' style Alfred Hitchcock. Yet, The Tingler delivers some shock moments and has the added value of some standout performances from Vincent Price, Patricia Cutts, Judith Evelyn and Philip Coolidge."

Dread Central called the film Castle's "magnum opus", while Nerdist singled out Price's performance, saying, "Vincent Price is typically great and as always commits himself fully to the proceedings, even if it’s utterly absurd."

Home media
Sony Pictures Home Entertainment released the film on DVD for its 40th anniversary in 1999. The film was later included on the William Castle Film Collection DVD set, released on October 20, 2009.

Scream Factory (under Sony license) released a Blu-ray edition of the film in August 2018.

Shown on the MeTV show Svengoolie on October 15, 2022.

See also
List of American films of 1959
List of films featuring hallucinogens

References

Sources

External links

 
 
 
 
  (21st century reviews)

1959 films
1959 horror films
American Sign Language films
American black-and-white films
Columbia Pictures films
Films directed by William Castle
Films set in a movie theatre
Films partially in color
American monster movies
Films with screenplays by Robb White
1950s monster movies
American science fiction horror films
1950s English-language films
1950s American films